Cape Foulwind is a headland on the West Coast of the South Island of New Zealand, overlooking the Tasman Sea. There is a lighthouse located on a prominent site on the headland. A walkway beginning at the lighthouse carpark traverses the rocky headland to Tauranga Bay and passes close by a colony of New Zealand fur seals. There is limestone quarry in the area, and a cement works operated nearby from 1958 to 2016.

In the lee of the cape, eastwards toward the Buller River mouth lies Carters Beach, claimed to be the only safe swimming beach on the West Coast of the South Island.

Toponymy 
The headland was named Rocky Cape by Abel Tasman, the first European to sight it, in 1642. However, the present name was given by English explorer James Cook in 1770 after his ship Endeavour was blown quite a distance offshore from this point.

Lighthouse 

The first lighthouse at Cape Foulwind was illuminated on 1 September 1876.  The timber support structure of this first lighthouse did not survive the environmental conditions, and a replacement lighthouse was erected on a concrete tower in 1926. The lighthouse is operated by Maritime New Zealand and is registered as a Category 2 Historic Place.

Walkway 

The features of the walkway include views of mountains and coastline, a colony of New Zealand fur seals (kekeno), and the lighthouse. The cliffs of Cape Foulwind and the small offshore islands are roosting and breeding grounds for seabirds including Australasian gannets. sooty shearwaters, fluttering shearwaters and fairy prions. A small rocky islet, Wall Island, offshore from the seal colony at Tauranga Bay, provides important habitat for seabird colonies and Little penguins (kororā). Hector's dolphin and orca may also be seen occasionally from the walkway.

Cement works 

In 1924, the Grey River Argus reported that the National Portland Cement Company was to be floated, to mine and process deposits of limestone and marl at Cape Foulwind. A proposal to construct a cement works at Cape Foulwind was announced in 1946. In 1953, it was reported that British interests had purchased a large area of land at Cape Foulwind. However, it was not until 1955 that the British company Tunnel Portland Cement (subsequently Hanson Cement) made a firm commitment to construct a plant. The plant was expected to have a production capability of 120,000 tons per annum, and employ 200 workers. The facility would use 40,000 tonnes of Buller coal annually. The capital required for the plant would be £2,500,000 with only £100,000 to be raised in New Zealand.

The first production from the new plant at Cape Foulwind was in November 1958, and the official opening was held on 15 February 1959.

In 2013, the owner Holcim, announced plans to close the factory, and cease making cement in New Zealand. The Cape Foulwind cement works closed in June 2016 after 58 years of operation, with the loss of 105 jobs.

Mineral sands mining 
In May 2022, a mining company Westland Mineral Sands, was granted resource consent by a joint hearings panel of the West Coast Regional Council and Buller District Council, for a proposal to mine 500,000 tonnes of mineral sands over seven years, at its property at Okari, to the south of Cape Foulwind.  A group of local residents appealed the decision of the hearings panel in the Environment Court, seeking lower limits on noise levels and more restrictions on operating hours.

Railway line 

The Cape Foulwind Railway was a branch railway line built in 1886 by the Westport Harbour Board, to transport rocks from their quarry to the breakwaters in the Buller River.

Three Steeples Rocks and Black Reef 

They are granite rocks, named by Jules Dumont d'Urville as Les Trois Cloches on 12 January 1827 and shown as Three Steeples on James Wyld's 1839 map. They had been known to sealers as Black Rocks since at least 1826. Patrick O'Regan thought these were the rocks illustrated by Isaack Gilsemans, when Tasman first anchored in New Zealand waters on 14 December 1642. The Dutch inscription beneath the drawings has been translated as the Rocky Point.

The lighthouse seems to have been effective, as no wreck has been recorded on the rocks, though in 1881 the Anchor Shipping and Foundry Company's paddle steamer Charles Edward (1864-1908) was holed and then towed to Westport. Also, in 1946, the Union Steamship's collier, Karepo, stranded on the rocks in a thick fog, but was later floated off.

Spotted shags roost on the Steeples, where salt-resistant taupata grows on the tops of the rocks.

Rock lobster (kōura), blue cod (rāwaru), gurnard (kumukumu), sharks and snapper (tāmure) are fished around the rocks and orca probably feed off the fur seal colonies. The shellfish Cantharidus puysegurensis and Leptomya retiaria have been found on the rocks.

Gallery

References

External links 

Photo of Cape Foulwind
  Video clip of cement works (1959)

Buller District
Foulwind